WXXQ (98.5 FM, "Q98.5") is a radio station serving the Rockford, Illinois, United States, area with a country music format. (Prior to country, the station ran a Top 40 format for a time). WXXQ broadcasts on FM frequency 98.5 MHz and is under ownership of Townsquare Media. WXXQ was originally WFRL-FM, with sister station WFRL-AM, sharing studios that were located in Freeport, Illinois.

On August 30, 2013, a deal was announced in which Townsquare would acquire 53 Cumulus Media stations, including WXXQ, for $238 million. The deal was part of Cumulus' acquisition of Dial Global; Townsquare and Dial Global were both controlled by Oaktree Capital Management. The Cumulus transaction was consummated effective November 14, 2013.

Their current weekday lineup is as follows:

6 a.m.-10 a.m.: Lil Zim & JB Love “In The Morning”
10 a.m.-3 p.m.: Jess “on the pretzel”
3 p.m.-7 p.m.: Buddy Logan
7 p.m.-12 a.m.: Taste of Country Nights
12 a.m.-6 a.m.: Brett Alan

References

External links

Q98.5 - Official Website

Country radio stations in the United States
XXQ
Townsquare Media radio stations
Radio stations established in 1965
1965 establishments in Illinois